Hurricane Patricia was the most intense tropical cyclone ever recorded in the Western Hemisphere and the second-most intense worldwide in terms of barometric pressure. It also featured the highest one-minute maximum sustained winds ever recorded in a tropical cyclone. Originating from a sprawling disturbance near the Gulf of Tehuantepec in mid-October 2015, Patricia was first classified a tropical depression on October 20. Initial development was slow, with only modest strengthening within the first day of its classification. The system later became a tropical storm and was named Patricia, the twenty-fourth named storm of the annual hurricane season. Exceptionally favorable environmental conditions fueled explosive intensification on October 22. A well-defined eye developed within an intense central dense overcast and Patricia grew from a tropical storm to a Category 5 hurricane in just 24 hours—a near-record pace. The magnitude of intensification was poorly forecast and both forecast models and meteorologists suffered from record-high prediction errors.

This ranked it just below Typhoon Tip of 1979 as the most intense tropical cyclone on record. Patricia's exceptional intensity prompted the retirement of its name in April 2016. Late on October 23, Patricia made landfall in a significantly weakened state near Cuixmala, Jalisco. Interaction with the mountainous terrain of Mexico induced dramatic weakening, faster than the storm had intensified. Within 24 hours of moving ashore, Patricia degraded into a tropical depression and dissipated soon thereafter late on October 24.

Origins

On October 11, 2015, an area of disturbed weather traversed Central America and emerged over the eastern Pacific Ocean. The disturbance moved slowly over the next few days, and coalesced into a Central American gyre—a broad monsoonal circulation. A tropical wave crossed the Caribbean and eventually reached Central America on October 15; the two systems merged the following day near the Gulf of Tehuantepec. A concurrent Tehuantepec gap wind event on the western side of the gyre, complemented by anticyclonic flow behind a cold front, enhanced vorticity and spurred the formation of an elongated area of low pressure on October 17. The broad system spanned several hundred miles from the Yucatán Peninsula into the eastern Pacific. A large, disorganized area of convection—showers and thunderstorms—accompanied the system, increasing in coverage substantially throughout the day. A strong pulse in the Madden–Julian oscillation—a propagating climate pattern associated with increased tropical cyclogenesis—may have aided in creating favorable conditions for further development.

Moving south of the Gulf of Tehuantepec on October 18, the system consolidated and developed a small, defined circulation. Associated convection became more concentrated around its center. Another gap wind event soon impacted the system, temporarily delaying development of the disturbance into a tropical depression. The low soon relocated to the northeast, aligning itself east of the gap wind event which aided in development. A small, well-defined circulation formed by early on October 20 within a broader cyclonic circulation. With increasing deep convection, the system is estimated to have become a tropical depression, assigned the identifier Twenty-E, by 06:00 UTC.

Rapid intensification

Located south of a mid-level ridge and the continuing gap wind event, the nascent depression moved slowly west-southwest on October 20. Initial environmental conditions were modestly favorable, allowing for steady intensification. The depression achieved tropical storm status by 00:00 UTC on October 21; the National Hurricane Center (NHC) assigned it the name Patricia accordingly. Throughout much of October 21, Patricia moved through a region of drier, more stable air and over relatively cool sea surface temperatures. Both of these factors served to delay intensification of the cyclone. The system unraveled substantially, with banding features dissipating and the low-level circulation becoming poorly defined. Once clear of the hindering factors, convection blossomed over Patricia late on October 21 and a central dense overcast formed over the center. Simultaneously, the storm accelerated west-northwest.

Consequently, Patricia commenced explosive intensification late on October 21. Patricia reached hurricane strength shortly after 00:00 UTC on October 22, featuring prominent outflow, well-defined banding features, and a developing eye. Data from NOAA Hurricane Hunters investigating the cyclone indicated Patricia to have reached Category 4 status on the Saffir–Simpson hurricane wind scale by 18:00 UTC; maximum sustained winds were estimated at  alongside a barometric pressure of 957 mbar (hPa) at this time.

Forecast errors

The rapid intensification of Patricia was well-anticipated but poorly forecast. Meteorologists at the NHC indicated the possibility of such in the system's first advisory as a tropical depression. They noted the only inhibiting factor would be how quickly the storm could organize an inner core. Just before the onset of rapid intensification, the agency was unable to utilize the Statistical Hurricane Intensity Prediction Scheme rapid intensification guidance due to technical errors. This likely contributed to even greater errors in the agency's forecast. Initial forecasts were consistently conservative with intensity and dramatic strengthening was not explicitly shown until rapid intensification was already underway.

At 03:00 UTC on October 22, the NHC forecast Patricia to achieve major hurricane status in 36 hours; less than 15 hours later, the system exceeded their forecast peak. Strengthening into a Category 5 hurricane was not forecast at all until Patricia had already reached such intensity, although in the intermediate advisory immediately before Patricia's upgrade to Category 5, the NHC noted that "Patricia could become a category 5 hurricane overnight", and in the preceding tropical weather discussion, noted that "Patricia could ... reach Category 5 intensity". This trend continued throughout the rapid intensification period, resulting in some of the largest errors on record through 48 hours; they were the worst-ever for the Eastern Pacific since the NHC took over operations for the basin in 1988. All forecast models saw enormous errors, most of which performed worse than the official NHC forecasts. No model accurately prognosticated the magnitude nor rate of the intensification.

Peak strength

During the overnight hours of October 22–23, Patricia turned northwest and decelerated slightly as it reached the western edge of the mid-level ridge. Furthermore, the final dropsonde observation from that mission at about 06:45 UTC indicated a central pressure of 879 mbar (hPa). Rapid development continued after the aircraft left the hurricane, as the three pressure readings during the mission indicated that the pressure fell at a rate of more than 7 mbar (hPa) per hour. Their findings also revealed an extraordinarily tight pressure gradient of 24 mbar (hPa) per nautical mile, among the steepest gradients on record.

Maximum winds are estimated at  alongside a pressure of 872 mbar (hPa), making Patricia the second-most intense tropical cyclone ever observed. It is possible that Patricia surpassed the all-time record of 870 mbar (hPa) set by Typhoon Tip in 1979 given the rate of deepening observed during the early morning mission.

Little change in strength took place for the next six hours; a shortwave trough crossing the Baja California Peninsula turned Patricia to the northeast and induced acceleration. Another reconnaissance mission around 18:00 UTC recorded a central pressure of 879 mbar (hPa). The aircraft was battered by severe turbulence (the result of updrafts and downdrafts) and the crew experienced maximum g-forces of +3.0 and -1.5.

Landfall and dissipation

Late on October 23, radar imagery depicted the formation of a secondary outer eyewall, indicative of an eyewall replacement cycle. Coinciding with the eyewall replacement cycle was an increase in southwesterly wind shear, a factor that further accelerated Patricia's degradation. The hurricane's eye soon became cloud-filled and rapid weakening ensued at an unprecedented pace.

This made Patricia the strongest hurricane to strike Mexico's Pacific coast, exceeding an unnamed storm in 1959 and Madeline in 1976 (the latter of which has not been reanalyzed). His observations also indicated a pressure gradient of 11 mbar (hPa) per nautical mile.

Patricia's winds at landfall are relatively uncertain, and the  value is based upon the Knaff–Zehr–Courtney pressure–wind relationship and an extrapolation of a 54 mbar (hPa) filling using the Dvorak Technique. Based on the station's distance from Patricia's eye, outside the radius of maximum winds, the observations from this station are considered unreliable. The highest reliably measured winds of  occurred in Pista between 22:30 and 23:00 UTC on October 23 before the anemometer failed.

Even faster weakening ensued through October 24 as the hurricane traversed the Sierra Madre mountains; its eye disappeared from satellite imagery within hours of moving ashore. The system weakened below hurricane strength by 03:00 UTC as it passed west of Guadalajara. Patricia accelerated inland between a trough over Northwestern Mexico and the ridge over the Gulf of Mexico. Convection dramatically decreased in organization and the low- and mid- to upper-level circulation centers of the cyclone soon decoupled. The system degraded into a tropical depression by 12:00 UTC as little organized convection remained, and the storm dissipated shortly thereafter over central Mexico. Unimpeded by the mountains of Mexico, the mid- to upper-level circulation of Patricia, accompanied by considerable moisture, continued northeast and interacted with a cold front over the western Gulf of Mexico. The new system produced flooding rains across large areas of Arkansas, Louisiana, Mississippi, and Texas.

Records

It is also the strongest tropical cyclone ever recorded in the Western Hemisphere. It exceeded the previous sustained wind record of  set by Hurricane Allen in 1980 and the pressure record of 882 mbar (hPa) set by Hurricane Wilma in 2005, both in the Atlantic basin. Reconnaissance also found a pressure gradient of 24 mbar (hPa) per nautical mile early on October 23, among the steepest gradients ever observed in a tropical cyclone.

On a global scale, Patricia's one-minute maximum sustained winds rank as the highest ever reliably observed or estimated globally in a tropical cyclone, surpassing Typhoon Haiyan of 2013, although the intensity of Haiyan was only estimated via satellite imagery (T8.0, the highest rating on the Dvorak scale). Since no aircraft reconnaissance was available for Haiyan, the record set by Patricia is uncertain and comparing the intensities of the two storms is problematic. According to the World Meteorological Organization, Typhoon Nancy of 1961 also produced  sustained winds; however, it is widely accepted that Western Pacific reconnaissance during the 1940s to 1960s overestimated cyclone intensity and Nancy's record is considered questionable. The most powerful wind gust produced by a tropical cyclone, as well as the highest non-tornadic winds ever recorded, is still retained by Cyclone Olivia in 1996:  was observed on Barrow Island, Western Australia.

The magnitude of Patricia's rapid intensification is among the fastest ever observed. During the same period, Patricia's central pressure fell by 95 mbar (hPa). This fell just short of the world-record intensification set by Typhoon Forrest in 1983, which featured a pressure drop of 100 mbar (hPa) in just under 24 hours. With a pressure of 932 mbar (hPa), Patricia is the strongest landfalling Pacific hurricane on record. The previous record was 941 mbar (hPa) set by Hurricane Odile in 2014. Similarly, the hurricane featured the fastest weakening while still over water in NHC's area of responsibility, with a pressure rise of 54 mbar (hPa) in the five hours before it made landfall. This is one of the highest temperatures ever observed in a tropical cyclone's eye worldwide.

See also

Other record-strength tropical cyclones:

 Hurricane Linda in 1997 – Previous record intensity in eastern Pacific basin, during a similarly strong El Niño event
 Typhoon Megi in 2010 – Research reconnaissance observed similarly intense sustained winds
 Typhoon Goni in 2020 – Strongest landfalling tropical cyclone by 1-minute sustained winds
 Typhoon Nancy in 1961 – Tied with Patricia for the highest winds observed in a tropical cyclone, considered unreliable
 Typhoon Tip in 1979 – Most intense tropical cyclone recorded in terms of pressure
 Hurricane Wilma in 2005 – Previous record low central pressure in the Western Hemisphere, still record low for the Atlantic
 Hurricane Allen in 1980 – Previous record high sustained winds in the Western Hemisphere, still record high for the Atlantic
 Typhoon Forrest in 1983 – Record-fastest intensification of any tropical cyclone; underwent a 100 mbar (hPa) pressure drop in just under 24 hours

Notes

References

2015 Pacific hurricane season
Patricia (2015)
Patricia Meteorological History